Eureka Municipal Airport , also known as Lt. William M. Milliken Airport, is a city-owned, public-use airport located two nautical miles (4 km) north of the central business district of Eureka, a city in Greenwood County, Kansas, United States. It is included in the National Plan of Integrated Airport Systems for 2011–2015, which categorized it as a general aviation facility.

Facilities and aircraft 
Eureka Municipal Airport covers an area of 148 acres (60 ha) at an elevation of 1,208 feet (368 m) above mean sea level. It has two runways: 18/36 is 3,504 by 60 feet (1,068 x 18 m) with an asphalt surface and 8/26 is 2,146 by 55 feet (654 x 17 m) with a turf surface.

For the 12-month period ending July 9, 2008, the airport had 4,000 general aviation aircraft operations, an average of 10 per day. At that time there were 12 aircraft based at this airport: 92% single-engine and 8% multi-engine.

References

External links 
 Aerial image as of October 1991 from USGS The National Map
 
 

Airports in Kansas
Buildings and structures in Greenwood County, Kansas
Eureka, Kansas